The Seres SF5 is an all-electric/range extender crossover SUV shown by Seres at the Auto Guangzhou in 2019.

Overview

The Seres SF5 was initially unveiled as a concept in 2018 alongside the SF7, however, this was revised to the production SF5 in early 2019. The SF5 has a 17-inch screen on the center console, and is one of the first vehicles to ever utilize the Ali OS 2.0 infotainment system.

The tire dimensions of the SF5 are 255/45 R20 and 255/40 R21.

Mass production version has a price range from 278,000 to 458,000 yuan.

Aito M5 

In December 2021 an extensively modified version of the SF5 was presented as the AITO M5. It was developed in cooperation with Huawei. The model was sold under a new brand called AITO, which stands for “Adding Intelligence to Auto”.

References

SF5
Electric concept cars
Production electric cars
Hybrid electric cars
Plug-in hybrid vehicles
Cars introduced in 2019
Crossover sport utility vehicles
Rear-wheel-drive vehicles
All-wheel-drive vehicles
Cars of China